Mesonauta egregius is a species of cichlid fish native to the Meta and Vichada River basins (both tributaries of the Orinoco) in South America.

References 

egregius
Freshwater fish of Colombia
Fish of Venezuela
Fish described in 1991